Prinz Waldemar was a steam passenger-cargo ship built in 1902 by the Reiherstieg Schiffswerfte & Maschinenfabrik of Hamburg for Hamburg America Line (HAPAG). She was named after Prince Waldemar of Prussia. The ship was primarily employed as a passenger and cargo carrier between Hamburg and South America during her career.

Design and construction
In 1900 HAPAG established a route from Germany to the east coast of South America which at the time was served by an old steamer SS Canadia. The first of these ships, SS Prinz Eitel Friedrich, was launched in early 1902 and became the first ship of the Prinzen class, as all the vessels were named after the princes of the German imperial family, the other four would be named SS Prinz Waldemar, SS Prinz Adalbert, SS Prinz Oskar and SS Prinz Sigismund.

Prinz Waldemar was laid down at Reiherstieg Schiffswerfte & Maschinenfabrik shipyard in Hamburg as a second of the Prinzen-class vessels, and launched on 7 May 1902 (yard number 409). After successful completion of sea trials Prinz Waldemar was handed over to her owners on 23 August of the same year. The ship was primarily intended as a cargo carrier, but at the same time had 25 spacious cabins built, that could accommodate between 60 and 100 first class passengers. The cabins were all on the second deck, well above the waterline, so that ports could be kept open all the voyage except in very stormy weather. Each cabin was equipped with heaters and fans to make journey more enjoyable. In addition, the ship could also carry around 560 third class passengers and 5,200 tons of cargo to handle which the vessel was equipped with eight steam cranes.

Operational history
After delivery Prinz Waldemar was immediately put on the Hamburg to Brazil route. On her trips down south, the ship would carry a variety of general cargo such as cheese, tea, cod, butter, cereals, wines etc. while on her return journey, the vessel would be loaded with coffee, and occasionally with agricultural products from Argentina and Uruguay, such as meat and cotton. Additionally, the vessel carried immigrants to Brazil, mostly Portuguese who were picked during her stop at Lisbon. Prinz Waldemar departed Hamburg for her maiden journey on September 10, 1902 for Brazilian ports of Santos and Rio de Janeiro via Lisbon. She arrived at Rio de Janeiro on October 4, and proceeded to Santos the next day. After loading 48,622 bags of coffee, Prinz Waldemar departed Santos on October 22 for Europe. To entice passengers, HAPAG added several ports, such as Dover and Boulogne on her return trips from Brazil. However, in 1906 the Royal Mail Steam Packet Company entered the competition for a lucrative trade between New York and West Indies, where HAPAG operated its own Atlas Line, acquired in 1901 from the United Fruit Company. Prinz Waldemar arrived in Rio de Janeiro for the last time on April 21, 1906, and consequently was reassigned to the Atlas Line, where the vessel was employed on the New York City to the West Indies route, calling at ports of Kingston, Puerto Limón, Savanilla and Cartagena starting in late summer of 1906.

Sinking
Prinz Waldemar departed New York City under command of Captain Paul Wintzer for her final journey on December 29, 1906 for Kingston where she arrived on January 4, 1907. After touching at Savanilla, and Cartagena, the vessel took course to Puerto Limón. On January 14, 1907 the vessel left Puerto Limón and took course to Jamaica where she was expected to arrive in the afternoon of January 17. At around 15:32 local time on January 14, Kingston was struck by a devastating earthquake which flattened the city, and destroyed among other things both Plum Point and Port Royal lighthouses at the entrance to the Kingston harbor.

Around 02:00 on January 17, 1907 Prinz Waldemar arrived at the Plum Point, about 10 miles east of Kingston, and attempted to navigate into the harbor. Due to a non-functioning lighthouse, the Captain got confused and ran aground on a coral reef, about half-mile east northeast of the lighthouse, in an approximate position , close to the place where another HAPAG liner, went ashore on December 16, 1906. All crew and passengers were able to safely disembark the ship. An attempt was made to refloat the vessel, however, on February 26, 1907 it was announced that HAPAG decided to abandon the salvage operations and the ship was declared a total wreck.

Notes 

1902 ships
Merchant ships of Germany
Steamships of Germany
Maritime incidents in 1907
Ships built in Hamburg
Ships of the Hamburg America Line
Ocean liners